Elections to Trafford Council were held on 1 May 2008. One-third of the council was up for election, with each successful candidate to serve a four-year term of office, expiring in 2012. The Conservative Party held overall control of the council.

After the election, the composition of the council was as follows:

Summary

The following summary indicates the number of seats which are being defended by each party.

Ward results

Altrincham ward

Ashton upon Mersey ward

Bowdon ward

Broadheath ward

Brooklands ward

Bucklow-St. Martins ward

Clifford ward

Davyhulme East ward

Davyhulme West ward

Flixton ward

Gorse Hill ward

Hale Barns ward

Hale Central ward

Longford ward

Priory ward

Sale Moor ward

St. Mary's ward

Stretford ward

Timperley ward

Urmston ward

Village ward

References

 Official Trafford Council Election page

2008 English local elections
2008
2000s in Greater Manchester